Samson in King Solomon's Mines is a 1964 Italian peplum film written and directed by Piero Regnoli.

Cast 
 Reg Park as Maciste
 Wandisa Guida as Fazira
 Dan Harrison as Abucar
 Giuseppe Addobbati as Namar
 Eleonora Bianchi as Samara
 Elio Jotta as Riad 
 Carlo Tamberlani as Zelea 
 Bruno Scipioni as Kadar

Production
Samson in King Solomon's Mines was produced by Italy's Panda Societa per L'Industria Cinematografica and filmed at Incir De Paolis Studios in Rome. The film had some location shooting done in South Africa for the wildlife scenes.

Release
Samson in King Solomon's Mines was released in Italy on 25 June 1964.

References

Footnotes

Sources

External links

1964 films
Peplum films
Maciste films
Films directed by Piero Regnoli
Films scored by Francesco De Masi
Sword and sandal films
1960s Italian films